Svetlana Saenko is a Ukrainian born wrestler who represented Moldova at the 2012 Summer Olympics.

Saenko was born on 27 October 1982 in Sumy, Ukrainian SSR, Soviet Union. She competed for Ukraine at the 2004 Summer Olympics. At the 2012 Summer Olympics held in London, United Kingdom, she competed in the women's freestyle 72 kg event where she reached the quarterfinals before being defeated by China's Wang Jiao. In June 2015, she competed in the inaugural European Games, for Moldova in wrestling, more specifically, Women's Freestyle in the 75 kilogram range. She earned a bronze medal.

References

External links
 

1982 births
Living people
Wrestlers at the 2004 Summer Olympics
Wrestlers at the 2012 Summer Olympics
Olympic wrestlers of Ukraine
Olympic wrestlers of Moldova
Moldovan female sport wrestlers
Ukrainian female sport wrestlers
Sportspeople from Sumy
Moldovan people of Ukrainian descent
European Games medalists in wrestling
European Games bronze medalists for Moldova
Wrestlers at the 2015 European Games